The canton of Revin is an administrative division of the Ardennes department, northern France. Its borders were modified at the French canton reorganisation which came into effect in March 2015. Its seat is in Revin.

It consists of the following communes:
Anchamps
Fépin
Fumay
Hargnies
Haybes
Montigny-sur-Meuse
Revin

References

Cantons of Ardennes (department)